Konthoujam may refer to:
 Konthoujam, a Meitei ethnic family name
 Konthoujam Tampha Lairembi, a Meitei goddess
 Konthoujam Lairembi Stone Inscription, a stone inscription in the sacred place of the goddess
 Konthoujam Assembly constituency, a Legislative Assembly constituency in Manipur State, India